Maimi may refer to:

Places and peoples 
 Maimi or Mayaimi, a native American people
 Meyami, a city in Iran

People 
 Maimi Yajima (b. 1992), a Japanese singer (Cute)